The Tapajós, also called the Santarém culture, were an indigenous Brazilian people, now extinct, who in the 17th century lived in the area around where the Tapajós flowed into the Amazon River, in the Brazilian state of Amazonas.

In the 1660s, the Tapajó language, along with the language of the neighboring Urucucú, were used for catechism, as the people did not speak Tupinamba (Lingua geral). Records of the language have been lost. All that remain are three names: Tapajó as the name of the tribe, the name of their chief, Orucurá, and Aura, which was identified with the Christian devil. These names cannot be explained as Tupi. Nothing appears to have been preserved of the neighboring Urucucú language.

The Tapajós river is named after the Tapajó people.

References

Indigenous peoples of South America
Indigenous peoples in Brazil
Extinct ethnic groups
Extinct languages of South America
Unclassified languages of South America